Nelson's Grocery, in Christine, North Dakota, was listed on the National Register of Historic Places in 1977.  It was built in 1905.  The listing included three contributing buildings.

According to its NRHP nomination, the store, "an institution in the business life of Christine for over 70 years, belongs to a rapidly disappearing architectural and commercial genre which once promoted the growth of small towns throughout North Dakota."

References

Commercial buildings on the National Register of Historic Places in North Dakota
Commercial buildings completed in 1905
National Register of Historic Places in Richland County, North Dakota
1905 establishments in North Dakota
Grocery store buildings